Vasilina Makovtseva (November 14, 1977) is a Russian film and theatre actress, one of the leading figures at the Kolayda-Theatre where she worked since 2004. Makovtseva is best remembered for her leading part in Krotkaya (A gentle creature), which she represented at Cannes Film Festival in 2017.

Biography
Vasilina Makovtseva was born in Turukhansk, Krasnoyarsk Krai, which was once considered a city of political prisoners. Her grandfather participated in the productions of provincial theater: he was both a decorator, and a director, and played several musical instruments. Her mother worked as a cashier at a small local airport. Vasilina's father worked as a blacksmith. There were eight children in the family and all had creative nature: one has passion in drawing, other- in writing, etc. Vasilina studied to play piano at Krasnoyarsk college of arts for 4 years.

She enrolled into the Yekaterinburg Theatre Institute and joined the Kirill Strezhnev's group. She took part in students productions on the stage of Academic Theater of Musical Comedy. There were: The Beatles: Lonely Hearts Club, Lion king, The Secret of Courage.

In 2003 she graduated from Yekaterinburg Theatre Institute and joined infamous Nikolay Kolyada`s Kolyada-theatre, where she is an actress at the moment. She has played more than thirty roles, not counting productions for children. With the theater troupe she performed at many International theater festivals: Passages in Nancy (2009) and Metz (2013), at Shakespeare in Gdansk (2011), Bucharest (2012), Gyula (2018) and others. During the Paris tour of 2010, they acted on the stage of the Odeon Theater.

At age 20 she made her debut in film. After years Sergei Loznitsa invited her to his film based on Dostoevsky in 2016 and gave her the leading part. That was A Gentle Creature.

Theatre Productions

Classic

 Cinderella — Cinderella
 The Government Inspector — Maria Antonovna
 Hamlet — Ophelia
 Marriage — Fyokla Ivanovna
 King Lear — Cordelia
 The Nameless Star — Mona
 A Streetcar Named Desire — Blanche DuBois / Stella
 The Cherry Orchard — Ranevskaya
 Boris Godunov — Marina Mniszech
 Masquerade — Nina, Arbenin's wife
 Dead Souls  — Anna Grigorievna
 Richard III — Lady Anne Neville
 Cat on a Hot Tin Roof — Margaret
 The Seagull — Arkadina
 The Forged Coupon — Young harlot
 The Old World Landowners — Yavdokha
 Ivan Fyodorovich Shponka and His Aunt — Natalia Grigorievna
 Optimistic Tragedy — Commissar

Contemporary drama

 Carmen's Alive!
 Madame Rosa
 Phoenix Bird
 Claustrophobia
 Tutankhamun
 Tenderness
 The Surveyor
 The Old Hare
 The Bouquet
 A Hen
 Two Plus Two
 The Front-line Woman
 Baba Chanel
 The Great Soviet Encyclopedia
 We Play Molière
 Grannie
 In This City He Lived And Worked ...
 The Purple Clouds
 The Twelve Chairs
 Mata Hari — Love
 Teach Me to Love
 Khabibulin goes from Vladivostok to Kaliningrad to Zoya
 Nosferatu
 Caligula

Filmography
 Delo Bylo v Gavrilovke / Дело было в Гавриловке by Dmitry Astrakhan, Viktor Kobzev, Vladimir Rubanov, 2007
 Spasite Nashi Dushi / Спасите наши души by Kirill Belevich, 2008
 Vazhnyak / Важняк. Игра навылет by Ilya Khotinenko, 2011
 29th Kilometr / 29 километр by Leonid Andronov, 2012
 Angels of Revolution / Ангелы революции by Aleksey Fedorchenko, 2014
 A Gentle Creature / Кроткая by  Sergei Loznitsa, 2017

Personal life
Makovtseva lives in Yekaterinburg and is married to Russian actor Alexander Zamuraev.

References

External links
 

1977 births
Living people
People from Turukhansky District
Actors from Yekaterinburg
Russian stage actresses
Russian film actresses
21st-century Russian actresses